The Roman Catholic Diocese of Murska Sobota  is a diocese located in the city of Murska Sobota in the Ecclesiastical province of Maribor in Slovenia.

History
 April 7, 2006: Established as Diocese of Murska Sobota from the Diocese of Maribor

Leadership
 Bishops of Murska Sobota (Roman rite)
 Bishop Marjan Turnšek (April 7, 2006 - November 28, 2009); appointed Coadjutor Archbishop of the Roman Catholic Archdiocese of Maribor
 Bishop Peter Štumpf, S.D.B. (November 28, 2009 – present)

See also
Roman Catholicism in Slovenia

External links
 
 Official site
 GCatholic.org
 Catholic Hierarchy

Roman Catholic dioceses in Slovenia
Christian organizations established in 2006
Roman Catholic dioceses and prelatures established in the 21st century